A reflecting pool, also called a reflection pool, is a water feature found in gardens, parks, and memorial sites. It usually consists of a shallow pool of water, undisturbed by fountain jets, for a reflective surface.

Design
Reflecting pools are often designed with the outer basin floor at the rim slightly deeper than the central area to suppress wave formation. They can be as small as a bird bath to as large as a major civic element. Their origins are from ancient Persian gardens.

List of notable pools 

 The Miroir d'eau (Water mirror) on Place de la Bourse in Bordeaux, France, is the world's largest reflecting pool.
 The Mughal garden reflecting pools at the Taj Mahal in Agra, India
 Chehel Sotoun in Iran
 The Lincoln Memorial Reflecting Pool and Capitol Reflecting Pool, in Washington, D.C.
 Mary Gibbs and Jesse H. Jones Reflection Pool, Hermann Park, Houston, Texas, U.S.
 The modernist Palácio do Planalto and Palácio da Alvorada in Brasília, Brazil
 Martin Luther King Jr. National Historical Park in Atlanta, Georgia
 The Oklahoma City National Memorial, at the site of the Oklahoma City bombing
 The Hollywood Bowl in Los Angeles, California, a former reflecting pool was located in front of the stage, circa 1953 - 1972.
 The National September 11 Memorial & Museum, located at the World Trade Center site in New York City, has two reflecting pools on the location where the Twin Towers stood.

Gallery

References 

Garden features
Bodies of water
Architectural elements
Islamic architectural elements
Persian gardens